Mount Faraway is a prominent, snow-covered mountain,  high, marking the southern extremity of the Theron Mountains of Antarctica. It was discovered by the Commonwealth Trans-Antarctic Expedition in 1956, and so named because during days of sledging toward this mountain they never seemed to be any nearer to it.

Important Bird Area
Mount Faraway is part of the 665 ha Coalseam Cliffs and Mount Faraway Important Bird Area (IBA), designated as such by BirdLife International because it supports a colony of about 10,000 breeding pairs of Antarctic petrels. The birds nest in a scree-filled hollow between two 60 m high dolerite cliffs, a location also known as Stewart Buttress. Other birds recorded as breeding in the vicinity include snow petrels and south polar skuas.

References

External links

 

Important Bird Areas of Antarctica
Seabird colonies
Mountains of Coats Land